Matías González (6 August 1925 in Artigas – 12 May 1984) was a Uruguayan footballer, who played for C.A. Cerro.

For the Uruguay national football team, he was part of the 1950 FIFA World Cup winning team, and he played in all four of Uruguay's matches in the tournament. In total he earned 33 caps for Uruguay.

References
World Cup Champions Squads 1930 - 2002
A primeira grande zebra do Mundial (in Spanish)
Uruguay - Record International Players

1925 births
1984 deaths
People from Artigas Department
Uruguayan footballers
Uruguay international footballers
1950 FIFA World Cup players
FIFA World Cup-winning players
C.A. Cerro players
Association football defenders